Vervain (from French) is the common name of plants of the genus Verbena. 

It can also refer to:
 The Vervain hummingbird from the West Indies
 The 25th day of Prairial in the French Republican Calendar, corresponding to June 15 in the Gregorian calendar
 HMS Vervain (K190), a Royal Navy Group 2 Flower class corvette
 Vervain, one of the Efrafan rabbits from the novel Watership Down
 Oncle Vervain, a character in the 2000 Anne Rice novel Merrick
 Liv Kristine's fifth solo album, Vervain
 A track on the Daniel Dumile album Special Herbs, Vols. 9 & 0
 A track on the Faith and the Muse debut album Elyria
 In The Vampire Diaries: An herb that has the power to weaken vampires and protects humans from their mind control.   
 A song from Rock band, The Dose